Heeter is a surname. Notable people with the surname include:

Cal Heeter (born 1988), American ice hockey player
Gene Heeter (born 1941), American football player

See also
Heeger
Peeter